was a Japanese daimyō of the early Edo period. He was famed for his forbidding of junshi, the form of traditional suicide whereby a retainer followed his lord in death. It was because of this dislike for junshi that one of his favorite retainers Yamamoto Tsunetomo went after his death to pen the Hagakure.

References

1632 births
1700 deaths
Daimyo
Samurai